Ivan Alekseyevich Vlasov (– 1969) was a Soviet and Russian politician the nominal head of state of the RSFSR twice during the rule of Joseph Stalin. 

Vlasov was born in Nikolayevka, Temnikovsky Uyezd, Tambov Governorate, and died about aged 65 or 66, in Moscow.

References

1903 births
1969 deaths
People from Ryazan Oblast
People from Temnikovsky Uyezd
Central Committee of the Communist Party of the Soviet Union candidate members
First convocation members of the Soviet of the Union
Second convocation members of the Soviet of the Union
Heads of state of the Russian Soviet Federative Socialist Republic
Members of the Supreme Soviet of the Russian Soviet Federative Socialist Republic, 1938–1947
Members of the Supreme Soviet of the Russian Soviet Federative Socialist Republic, 1947–1951
Recipients of the Order of Lenin
Recipients of the Order of the Red Banner of Labour
Burials at Vagankovo Cemetery